George Church may refer to:

George Church (sport shooter) (1889–1951), South African sports shooter
George Church (tennis) (1891–1946), American tennis player
George Church (priest), Archdeacon of Malta, 1971–1975
George Church (geneticist) (born 1954), American molecular geneticist
George Earl Church (1835–1910), American civil engineer and geographer
George W. Church Sr. (1903–1956), American businessman, founder of Church's Chicken

See also
St George's Church (disambiguation)